Bersama abyssinica is a species of medium-sized evergreen tree in the Francoaceae family. The leaves are pinnately divided with a strongly winged rachis (hence the common name winged bersama).  The inflorescence is a spike.

This species is distributed across sub-Saharan Africa and includes two subspecies:
B. abyssinica Fresen. subsp. abyssinica Fresen.  
B. abyssinica Fresen. subsp. rosea (Hoyle) Mikkelsen

The subspecies rosea is endemic to Tanzania, where it is considered vulnerable.

Bersama abyssinica produces a hard, heavy wood that is used in the construction of houses in West Africa.

References

External links
 Images from the Flora of Zimbabwe
 

Francoaceae
Trees of Africa
Flora of Tanzania
Taxonomy articles created by Polbot